Uhtred mac Fergus ( – 22 September 1174) was Lord of Galloway from 1161 to 1174, ruling jointly with his brother Gille Brigte (Gilbert). They were sons of Fergus of Galloway; it was believed that they were half brothers, but Duncan of Carrick was addressed as cousin by the English King, as was Uchtred. (The term "cousin" in address does not necessarily connote a family tie; it was used between even minor "kings" to suggest that sender and receiver were of mutually considerable rank). Their mother's name is not known for sure, but she must have been one of the many illegitimate daughters of Henry I of England, most likely Elizabeth Fitzroy.

Career
As a boy he was sent as a hostage to the court of King Malcolm IV of Scotland. When his father, Prince Fergus, died in 1161, Uchtred was made co-ruler of Galloway along with Gilla Brigte. They participated in the disastrous invasion of Northumberland under William I of Scotland in 1174. King William was captured, and the Galwegians rebelled, taking the opportunity to slaughter the Normans and English in their land. During this time Uchtred was brutally mutilated, blinded, castrated, and killed by his brother Gille Brigte and Gille Brigte's son, Máel Coluim. Gille Brigte then seized control of the whole of Galloway.

Marriage and children

Uchtred had married Gunhilda of Dunbar, daughter of Waltheof of Allerdale and they were the parents of:
 Lochlann of Galloway (also known as Roland),
 Eve of Galloway, wife of Walter de Berkeley
 Christina, wife of William de Brus, 3rd Lord of Annandale.
 Fergus, died after 1213, knight, identified as 'brother of Roland' in 1196 charter
 ___, son name unknown, died 30 September 1185, in conflict with Gillecolm

Sources
Taylor, James. The Pictorial History of Scotland, 1859
John of Fordun (chronicler)
Roger of Hoveden (chronicler)

References

McDonald, R. Andrew. Outlaws of Medieval Scotland, 2003 - Tuckwell Press.  [McDonald, Outlaws of Medieval Scotland]

1120s births
1174 deaths
History of Galloway
Medieval Gaels from Scotland
12th-century Scottish people
People from Dumfries and Galloway
Lords of Galloway
Blind royalty and nobility
Castrated people